The 2016 Giro dell'Emilia was the 99th edition of the Giro dell'Emilia road cycling one day race. It was held on 24 September 2016 as part of the 2016 UCI Europe Tour in category 1.HC, over a distance of 213 km, starting in Bologna and ending in Madonna di San Luca, Bologna.

Teams
Twenty-five teams were invited to take part in the race. These included ten UCI WorldTeams, thirteen UCI Professional Continental teams and two UCI Continental teams.

Results

References 

Giro dell'Emilia
Giro dell'Emilia
Giro dell'Emilia